Thalassa is a primordial Greek sea goddess.

Thalassa may also refer to:

 Thalassa (band), a band which represented Greece at the Eurovision Song Contest 1998
 Thalassa (beetle), a genus of ladybug
 Thalassa (moon), a moon of the planet Neptune
 Thalassa (TV series), a French documentary programme
 , a ship of the Ifremer
 A fictional planet in Arthur C. Clarke's novel The Songs of Distant Earth
 A character from the Star Trek original series episode "Return to Tomorrow"
 Thalassa Gramarye, a fictional musician in the video game Apollo Justice: Ace Attorney

See also
 Thalassia (disambiguation)
 Thalasso (disambiguation)
 Thalassocracy
 Thalassotherapy
 Panthalassa